The Women's 200 Freestyle swimming event at the 25th SEA Games was held on December 13, 2009.

Results

Final

Preliminary heats

References

Swimming at the 2009 Southeast Asian Games
2009 in women's swimming